The Richardson Building is a commercial structure located in Union City, Oklahoma. Constructed in 1910 as a bank building, it was listed on the National Register of Historic Places in 1983.

The building was a center of commerce for the town of 300 people. A fire destroyed the interior of the structure in 1928, but the roof was replaced and the building was restored. The Bank of Union moved its operations to a new building in 1977, and the Richardson Building fell into disrepair.

References

Commercial buildings on the National Register of Historic Places in Oklahoma
Buildings and structures completed in 1910
Canadian County, Oklahoma
National Register of Historic Places in Canadian County, Oklahoma